Shatter is a 2008 psychological thriller novel written by the Australian author Michael Robotham.

Plot outline
Professor Joseph O'Loughlin (referred to as Joe throughout the novel) is tasked by the police with stopping a woman, Christine Wheeler, from committing suicide, only to fail. When Wheeler's teenage daughter appears onto his doorstep, she insists that her mother would not have jumped off a bridge as she did, for she was not suicidal and had a fear of heights. Haunted by his failure to save her and driven by a need to understand what caused her death, Joe searches for the truth, only to be caught up in a string of murders all while dealing with his own problems with Parkinson's disease and his marriage.

Awards
Ned Kelly Awards for Crime Writing, Best Novel, 2008: winner
Crime Writers' Association (UK), The CWA Ian Fleming Steel Dagger, Best Thriller, 2008: shortlisted

Dedication
"This is for Mark Lucas, a friend first."

Reviews
Sue Turnbull, in The Age, was impressed with the novel: "Thematically complex, artfully structured, beautifully written and observed, Shatter confirms Robotham's place in the front row of crime."

Reviewing the book in Dark Scribe magazine, Rick R. Reed compared the villain to Thomas Harris's Hannibal Lecter and went on: "Shatter really has it all when it comes to the thriller genre: it’s fast-paced, has uniquely and wonderfully-drawn characters, contains a great mystery at its center, and makes you want to read more from Michael Robotham."

References

Australian crime novels
2008 novels
Ned Kelly Award-winning works
Sphere Books books